Melur is a Panchayat village in Coonoor Taluk of the Nilgiris District, Tamil Nadu, India.It is located 14 KM towards South from Udhagamandalam and 13 KM from Coonoor, 505 KM from State capital Chennai.

Population
The total population in Mellur is 3244 and the number of houses is 3944.

References

Villages in Nilgiris district